Lili Berky (born Amália Terézia Berky) was a Hungarian actress. She was born on 15 March 1886 in Győr, Austria-Hungary, and died on 5 February 1958. She was married to Gyula Gózon.

Selected filmography
 The Yellow Foal (1913)
 White Nights (1916)
 Struggling Hearts (1916)
 Tales of the Typewriter (1916)
 Miska the Magnate (1916)
 Man of Gold (1919)
 Pardon, tévedtem (1933)
 The New Relative (1934)
 Márciusi mese (1934)
 Romance of Ida (1934)
 The Dream Car (1934)
 Villa for Sale (1935)
 Modern Girls (1937)
 Duel for Nothing (1940)
 Sarajevo (1940)
 Rózsafabot (1940)
 Seven Plum Trees (1940)
 Kerek Ferkó (1943)
 A Tanítónő (1945)
 Különös házasság (1951)

External links

1886 births
1958 deaths
Burials at Kerepesi Cemetery
Hungarian film actresses
Hungarian silent film actresses
People from Győr
20th-century Hungarian actresses
Austro-Hungarian people